Juan Francisco Aragone (born 24 May 1883 in Carmelo – deceased 7 May 1953 in Montevideo) was a Uruguayan cleric.

After over a decade vacancy, on 3 July 1919 Aragone was appointed as the second Roman Catholic archbishop of Montevideo. In his coat of arms can be read the motto Omnia possum in eo qui me confortat.

In 1940 he resigned and was appointed titular archbishop of Melitene. He died in 1953.

References

External links

 

1883 births
1953 deaths
People from Colonia Department
Uruguayan people of Italian descent
Bishops appointed by Pope Benedict XV
20th-century Roman Catholic archbishops in Uruguay
Knights Grand Cross of the Order of Isabella the Catholic
Burials at Montevideo Metropolitan Cathedral
Uruguayan Roman Catholic archbishops
Roman Catholic archbishops of Montevideo